Ray Lovelock may refer to:

Ray Lovelock (Macross), a fictional character in the Macross universe
Ray Lovelock (actor) (1950–2017), Italian actor